Pul Shekhani is located 28 km from the Dera Ghazi Khan district in Pakistan, near the Koh Suleiman mountain range.

Population
Its population is approximately 25,000.

Religion
Most of the people are Muslims.

Language
In this village most of the people use the Saraiki language to communicate with one another.

Culture
Mela Pul Shekhani is held every year to promote their culture, language and brotherhood.

Income
Agriculture and cattle are the major sources of income.

Populated places in Dera Ghazi Khan District
Villages in Dera Ghazi Khan District